Something's Wrong may refer to:

 Something's Wrong (album), a compilation album by Violent Femmes
 Something's Wrong / Lost Forever, an album by Scott H. Biram
 "Something's Wrong", a song from James Taylor's self-titled album
 "Something's Wrong", a song from Lost in Time (Eric Benét album)
 "Something's Wrong", a song from Tommy Stinson's album Village Gorilla Head
 "Something's Wrong", a song from The Jesus and Mary Chain's album Psychocandy
 "Something's Wrong", a song from Masta Ace's album Disposable Arts
 "Something's Wrong", a song from Pretty Lights's album Filling Up the City Skies
 "Something's Wrong", a song from Dillard Hartford Dillard's album Permanent Wave
 "Something's Wrong", a song from Dillard & Clark's The Fantastic Expedition of Dillard & Clark
 "Something's Wrong", a song from The Patridge Family's album The Partridge Family Notebook
 "Something's Wrong", a song from Siegel–Schwall Band's album Sleepy Hollow
 "Something's Wrong", a song from Sloan's album Never Hear the End of It
 "Something's Wrong", a song from Barbara Dickson's album Do Right Woman
 "Something's Wrong", a song from Swedish band Navigators's album Daily Life Illustrators
 "Something's Wrong", a song from Timothy B. Schmit's album Playin' It Cool
 "Something's Wrong", a song from the musical Marie Antoinette
 "Something's Wrong", a song from the musical comedy Men Shouldn't Sing
 "Something's Wrong", a song by Avengers; see Avengers (album)
 "Something's Wrong", a song by Fats Domino
 "Something's Wrong", a song by The Walls
 "Something's Wrong", a song by New World (band)
 "Something's Wrong", a song by Charlie Louvin
 "Something's Wrong", a song by Los Furios
 "Something's Wrong", a song by K's Choice from album Paradise in Me
 "Something's Wrong (Change It)", a song from Casiopea's album Sun Sun
Something's Wrong (children's book), 2021 book by Jory John

See also 
 Something Wrong (disambiguation)